Pseudariotus is a genus of ant-like leaf beetles in the family Aderidae. There is one described species in Pseudariotus, P. notatus.

References

Further reading

 
 

Aderidae
Articles created by Qbugbot